Kwok Chi (Michael) Chan  (born ) is a politician in Ontario, Canada. He was a Liberal member of the Legislative Assembly of Ontario from 2007 until 2018. He represented the riding of Markham-Unionville. Chan served as a Cabinet Minister, during his entire tenure in politics in the governments of Dalton McGuinty and Kathleen Wynne. Michael Chan presently serves as a Senior Business Advisor for the law firm Miller Thomson LLP in Vaughan. Chan also serves as a member of the board of governors at the Seneca College of Applied Arts and Technology.

Background
Chan was born in Guangzhou, and his father was an official in the Kuomintang. As the Chinese Communist Party took power in China, Mr. Chan's family went to Macau, before moving to Hong Kong and eventually migrating to Canada in 1969, when he was 18. Chan has lived in Markham since 1995.

Before entering politics he was president of the federal Liberal Party of Canada riding association for the Markham—Unionville constituency held by MP John McCallum. According to an endorsement on Chan's website, John McCallum and Chan are close friends.

Political career
Chan was elected in a February 8, 2007 by-election, necessitated by the resignation of former Liberal MPP Tony Wong, who left his seat in the Legislative Assembly of Ontario to successfully run for York Regional Council in 2006. He was re-elected in 2007, 2011, and 2014.

In February, 2007 he was appointed to cabinet as Minister of Revenue. In October 2007, after the election he was moved to Minister of Citizenship and Immigration. In 2010 he was moved again to Minister of Tourism, Culture. A year later the mandate of the ministry was changed slightly to include Sport issues. In November 2012 he assumed the roles Citizenship and Immigration and responsibility for the Pan/Parapan American Games from Charles Sousa when Sousa announced he was running for the leadership of the Liberal Party.

In February 2013, when Kathleen Wynne took over as the new premier, she confirmed Chan in his roles as Minister of Tourism, Culture and Sport and Minister Responsible for the 2015 Pan/Parapan American Games. In June 2014, Wynne appointed Chan as the Minister of Citizenship, Immigration and International Trade. Chan was instrumental in fundraising for the Liberals, as well as being active in the recruitment of Chinese Canadians to campaign for seats at both the federal and provincial levels.

Chan announced his retirement from provincial politics in April 2018, a few months before the next Ontario election. During the 2019–20 Hong Kong protests, Chan publicly condemned the pro-democracy protesters and supported the Hong Kong Police Force's response, while attributing the protests to alleged manipulation by foreign actors.

In August 2022, Chan registered as a York Region council candidate. He was elected to York Regional council in the 2022 municipal elections, and became deputy mayor of Markham.

Involvement in alleged Chinese government interference

In 2010, the Canadian Security Intelligence Service allegedly became concerned that Chan had become too close to the Chinese consulate in Toronto, prompting a senior federal official to caution the provincial government about his alleged conduct. Former Ontario premier Dalton McGuinty and his successor, Kathleen Wynne, both dismissed the allegations against Chan.

In 2015, Chan sued The Globe and Mail for a report that claimed he was the subject an investigation by the Canadian Security Intelligence Service (CSIS) for ties to officials in Beijing and susceptibility to influence by the Chinese government. Chan responded that his engagement with the Chinese government was an appropriate aspect of his role as the Minister of Immigration and International Trade in Ontario. Former Ontario premier Kathleen Wynne also rejected the accusations against him. Toronto lawyer Ping Tam suggested that Chan was being targeted because he was encouraging young Chinese-Canadians to engage in politics and had supported a failed 2013 agreement between the Toronto District School Board to install Confucius Institutes in local schools. Chan also threatened Alberta premier Jason Kenney with a lawsuit over criticism of Chan's support for Beijing.

On February 24, 2023, Global News reported that its intelligence sources in CSIS had said that Chan had arranged the ouster of Liberal MP Geng Tan in Don Valley North in favour of Han Dong in advance of the 2019 federal election because China was unhappy with what Tan was doing. Sources claim Justin Trudeau and senior Liberal Party officials ignored CSIS warnings about Chan and Dong. Chan, Dong, and the Chinese embassy denied the accusations, with Chan describing the leaks as "outrageous" and possibly contrary to the Security of Information Act.

It has been alleged by anonymous officials that the Trudeau government may have downplayed warnings about Chan because of fundraising ties to senior party officials. According to one anonymous Greater Toronto Area Liberal party politician, "Michael Chan is involved centrally in decision-making, and the party consults with him and his team... [t]hey are kingmakers of the party, standing behind the scenes and moving their pawns. So if they can produce the money, the party is putty in their hands.”

Cabinet posts

Electoral record

References

External links

1951 births
21st-century Canadian politicians
Canadian politicians of Chinese descent
Chinese emigrants to Canada
Canadian people of Hong Kong descent
Living people
Members of the Executive Council of Ontario
Ontario Liberal Party MPPs
People from Markham, Ontario
Ontario municipal councillors